Per-Ulrik Johansson (born 6 December 1966) is a Swedish professional golfer, who won six times on the European Tour and played in two winning European Ryder Cup teams.

Early life
Johansson grew up in Västervik in Småland, Sweden, and was a promising ice hockey player at 14 years of age, when he decided to give priority to golf training instead. He won the unofficial Swedish Youth Championship, the Colgate Cup, at his age level and represented his country on boys and youth level.

Amateur career
In 1983, 15 years old, Johansson was a member of the Swedish team winning the European Boys' Team Championship, for players up to 18 years of age, at Helsinki Golf Club, Finland.

In August 1986, Johansson won the Leven Gold medal at Leven Links, Scotland, with a 72-hole score of 9-under-par 275, 2 strokes ahead on Colin Montgomerie.

Like many European golfers, Johansson took a golf scholarship in the United States as sports scholarships do not exist in Europe. He attended Arizona State University in 1986 and was a member of the same 1990 NCAA Championship winning team as Phil Mickelson.

Professional career
Johansson turned professional in late 1990 and won a European Tour card on his first visit to Qualifying School. His first year on tour, he was the 1991 Sir Henry Cotton Rookie of the Year.

Within the span of a month, he was a member of winning Swedish teams at the 1991 Dunhill Cup, together with Anders Forsbrand and Mats Lanner, and the 1991 World Cup, together with Anders Forsbrand. Together with Forsbrand, Johansson was chosen to defend the 1991 World Cup title, from Rome, Italy for Sweden, in 1992 in Madrid, Spain, but the Swedish team finished second, one shot behind the United States team of Fred Couples and Davis Love III.

In his first ten seasons on the European Tour, Johansson made the top 20 of the Order of Merit four times, with a best ranking of 11th in 1997. He won five European Tour events between 1991 and 1997 and has featured in the top 50 of the Official World Golf Ranking.

Johansson was the first Swede to play in the Ryder Cup twice (1995 and 1997); he finished on the winning side both times. In his Sunday singles match in 1995, he played collegiate teammate Phil Mickelson.

In 2001, Johansson moved to the United States to play on the PGA Tour, after successfully negotiating the 2000 Qualifying School. He was a member of the PGA Tour for four seasons, but failed to make the same impact as he had in Europe. His best PGA Tour finish was tied for sixth, which by coincidence he achieved once in each of those four seasons. In 2001 and 2002 he only just held onto his card via his money list placing. In 2003 he failed to do so, but he made a successful return trip to the PGA Tour Qualifying Tournament. In 2004 he lost six months to injury and ended the year with a failed trip to the Qualifying Tournament. In 2005 and 2006 he played on the Nationwide Tour with appearances on the PGA Tour and the European Tour without recovering his form.

In 2007, Johansson had to rely on wild card entries to play on the European Tour. Ten years after his last win, a six shot victory, with a new tournament record 23 under par, at the Russian Open, secured his playing rights until 2009.

He retired in August 2009 because of injury and came back to play three tournaments, where he was invited, on the European Tour in 2011, before he finally retired.

Awards, private life
In 1991, Johansson's achievements earned him the Swedish Golfer of the Year award, male and female, professional and amateur.

In 1992, the three teammates at the 1991 Dunhill Cup victory, Johansson, Mats Lanner and Anders Forsbrand was each, by the Swedish Golf Federation, awarded the Golden Club, the highest award for contributions to Swedish golf, as the 11th, 12th and 13th recipients.

In 1998, Johansson was awarded honorary membership of the PGA of Sweden.

Johansson is married to Jill, a sister of Jesper Parnevik, and they have three daughters, Stella, Nova and Luna.

They formerly lived in West Palm Beach, Florida, United States, but when Johansson retired from his PGA Tour career, they moved back to Sweden, to live in Åkersberga outside Stockholm.

Amateur wins
1986 Leven Gold Medal (Leven Links, Scotland)
1989 Nordic Amateur Championship

Professional wins (7)

European Tour wins (6)

*Note: The 1994 Chemapol Trophy Czech Open was shortened to 66 holes due to frost.

European Tour playoff record (1–0)

Other wins (1)

Results in major championships

CUT = missed the half-way cut
"T" = tied

Summary

Most consecutive cuts made – 6 (1996 PGA – 1998 U.S. Open)
Longest streak of top-10s – 1

Results in The Players Championship

CUT = missed the halfway cut
"T" indicates a tie for a place

Results in World Golf Championships

1Cancelled due to 9/11

QF, R16, R32, R64 = Round in which player lost in match play
NT = No tournament

Team appearances
Amateur
European Boys' Team Championship (representing Sweden): 1983 (winners), 1984
European Amateur Team Championship (representing Sweden): 1987, 1989
EGA Trophy (representing the Continent of Europe): 1987 (winners)
Source:

Professional
Ryder Cup (representing Europe): 1995 (winners), 1997 (winners)
Alfred Dunhill Cup (representing Sweden): 1991 (winners), 1992, 1995, 1997, 1998, 2000
World Cup (representing Sweden): 1991 (winners), 1992, 1997

See also
2000 PGA Tour Qualifying School graduates

References

External links

Swedish male golfers
Arizona State Sun Devils men's golfers
European Tour golfers
PGA Tour golfers
Ryder Cup competitors for Europe
Sportspeople from Uppsala
Sportspeople from West Palm Beach, Florida
1966 births
Living people